The Caxton Club is a private social club and bibliophilic society founded in Chicago in 1895 to promote the book arts and the history of the book. To further its goals, the club holds monthly (September through June) dinner meetings and luncheons, sponsors bibliophile events (often in collaboration with the Newberry Library and with other regional institutions) and exhibitions, and publishes books, exhibition catalogs, and a monthly journal, The Caxtonian. The Caxton Club is a member club of the Fellowship of American Bibliophilic Societies.

History

The Caxton Club was founded in 1895 by a group of fifteen bibliophiles to support the publication of fine books in the style of the then-new Arts and Crafts Movement. The club's name honors the fifteenth-century English printer William Caxton.

The Caxton Club flourished until World War I, after which its membership declined. The club was revived, however, and began to hold regular monthly meetings. The club was exclusively for men until 1976 when the first women were elected to membership.

The Club published a number of fine editions in partnership with the Lakeside Press of Chicago.

The Club gives out scholarships and grants to students and researchers in the book arts.

Notable members

Gwendolyn Brooks – author, poet
Francis Fisher Browne – editor
Lee Pierce Butler – bibliographer, librarian, professor
Alexander Wilson Drake – artist, collector, critic
James Ellsworth – banker, industrialist
Charles Lang Freer – art collector, industrialist, philanthropist
Michael Gorman – librarian
Gustaf VI Adolf of Sweden – book collector and scholar

Henry Eduard Legler – activist, librarian
Frank Orren Lowden – 25th governor of Illinois, United States representative from Illinois, and candidate for the Republican presidential nominations in 1920 and 1928
William Mulliken – Olympic swimmer
Audrey Niffenegger – author and artist
Carl B. Roden – librarian
Ralph Fletcher Seymour – artist, author, publisher
Vincent Starrett – author and newspaperman
Robert Wedgeworth – librarian and executive
Frank Lloyd Wright – architect

See also

 List of American gentlemen's clubs
 Books in the United States

References

Further reading

External links
Official website
Caxton Club Collection finding aid, University of Illinois at Chicago Special Collections and University Archives
Caxton Club records at The Newberry

Bibliophiles
Clubs and societies in the United States
Culture of Chicago
Organizations based in Chicago
Organizations established in 1895
Gentlemen's clubs in the United States
1895 establishments in Illinois